Riley Catherine Hoover (born 23 January 1998) is an American-born Guamanian footballer who plays as a defender. She has been a member of the Guam women's national team.

Early life
Hoover was raised in Brea, California.

International goals
Scores and results list Guam's goal tally first

Personal life
Hoover's sister Kaycee is also a Guamanian international footballer.

References

1998 births
Living people
Women's association football defenders
Guamanian women's footballers
Guam women's international footballers
American women's soccer players
Soccer players from California
Sportspeople from Orange County, California
People from Brea, California
Cal State Fullerton Titans women's soccer players